Aggressive NK-cell leukemia is a disease with an aggressive, systemic proliferation of natural killer cells (NK cells) and a rapidly declining clinical course.

It is also called aggressive NK-cell lymphoma.

Signs and symptoms
Patients usually present with constitutional symptoms (malaise, weight loss, fatigue), and hepatosplenomegaly is commonly found on physical exam. Lymphadenopathy is also found to a lesser extent. Due to the aggressive nature of the disease, patients may initially present at a more advanced stage, with coagulopathies, hemophagocytic syndrome, and multi-organ failure. Rarely, individuals who have an aggressive NK cell lymphoma that is associated with latent infection with the Epstein-Barr virus (see next section) present with or develop extensive allergic reactions to mosquito bites. The symptoms of these reactions range from a greatly enlarged bite site that may be painful and involve necrosis to systemic symptoms (e.g. fever, swollen lymph nodes, abdominal pain, and diarrhea), or, in extremely rare cases, to life-threatening anaphylaxis.

Cause
This disease has a strong association with the Epstein–Barr virus (EBV), but the true pathogenesis of this disease has yet to be described. The cell of origin is believed to be an NK cell. Blastoid NK cell lymphoma appears to be a different entity and shows no association with EBV.

Sites of involvement
This disease is typically found and diagnosed in peripheral blood, and while it can involve any organ, it is usually found in the spleen, liver, and bone marrow.

Diagnosis
Leukemic cells are invariably present in samples of peripheral blood to a variable extent. Pancytopenia (anemia, neutropenia, thrombocytopenia) is commonly seen as well.

Peripheral blood
The leukemic cells have a diameter mildly greater than a large granular lymphocyte (LGL) and have azurophilic granules and nucleoli of varying prominence. Nuclei may be irregular and hyperchromatic.

Bone marrow
Bone marrow involvement runs the spectrum between an inconspicuous infiltrate to extensive marrow replacement by leukemic cells. Reactive histiocytes displaying hemophagocytosis can be seen interspersed in the neoplastic infiltrate.

Other organs
Leukemic involvement of organs is typically destructive on tissue sections with necrosis and possibly angioinvasion, and the monotonous infiltrate may be diffuse or patchy.

Immunophenotype
The immunophenotype of this disease is the same as extranodal NK/T-cell lymphoma, nasal type and is shown in the table below. CD11b and CD16 show variable expression.

Genetic findings
Due to the NK lineage, clonal rearrangements of lymphoid (T cell receptor; B cell receptor) genes are not seen. The genome of the Epstein Barr virus (EBV) is detected in many cases, along with a variety of chromosomal abnormalities.

Treatment

Currently Aggressive NK-cell leukemia, being a subtype of PTCL, is treated similarly to B-cell lymphomas. However, in recent years, scientists have developed techniques to better recognize the different types of lymphomas, such as PTCL. It is now understood that PTCL behaves differently from B-cell lymphomas and therapies are being developed that specifically target these types of lymphoma. Currently, however, there are no therapies approved by the U.S. Food and Drug Administration (FDA) specifically for PTCL. Anthracycline-containing chemotherapy regimens are commonly offered as the initial therapy. Some patients may receive a stem cell transplant. Novel approaches to the treatment of PTCL in the relapsed or refractory setting are under investigation.

Epidemiology
This rare form of leukemia is more common among Asians in comparison to other ethnic groups. It is typically diagnosed in adolescents and young adults, with a slight predominance in males.

Research directions 
Pralatrexate is one compound currently under investigations for the treatment of PTCL.

References

External links 

Acute lymphocytic leukemia
Epstein–Barr virus–associated diseases
Rare cancers